Fronsac is the name or part of the name of the following communes in France:

 Fronsac, Gironde, in the Gironde department
 Fronsac, Haute-Garonne, in the Haute-Garonne department
 La Lande-de-Fronsac, in the Gironde department
 Saint-Genès-de-Fronsac, in the Gironde department
 Saint-Michel-de-Fronsac, in the Gironde department